Agradani is a Bengali social drama film directed and produced by Palash Bannerjee based on a same name story of Bengali novelist Tarashankar Bandopadhyay. This film was released in 1983 under the banner of Palash Bandyopadhyay Productions.

Plot
There are a particular class of Brahmins called Agradani, who are to be the chosen to perform the eating rituals on behalf of the dead. Punyo Chakraborty, a poor man belongs to the Agradani community lives with his family in a village. Local zamindar promises him to provide lands and money if Punyo lie down in front of the room where Zamindar's son is going to be born. In morning Punyo watches that zamindar's wife again gave birth to a dead child, soon he replaces the dead son with his new born baby. The baby grown ups as zamindar's son. Only Punyo knows that he is the biological father of the boy. One day a circumstances comes where he is forced to perform the funeral rituals for his own son.

Cast
 Soumitra Chatterjee as Punyo Chakraborty
 Anil Chatterjee as Zamindar
 Sandhya Roy
 Chhaya Devi
 Prasenjit Chatterjee
 Sumitra Mukherjee
 Bimal Deb
 Nimai Ghosh

References

External links
 

1983 films
Bengali-language Indian films
1980s Bengali-language films
Indian drama films
Films based on Indian novels
Films set in the British Raj
Films based on works by Tarasankar Bandyopadhyay